The Department of Mathematics  at the Massachusetts Institute of Technology (also known as Course 18) is one of the leading mathematics departments in the US
and the world. In the 2010 US News ranking of US graduate programs, the department was ranked number one, while the second place was a 4-way tie among Harvard, Princeton, Stanford, and UC Berkeley.

The current faculty of around 50 members includes Wolf Prize winner Michael Artin, Shaw Prize winner George Lusztig, Gödel Prize winner Peter Shor, and numerical analyst Gilbert Strang.

History
Originally under John Daniel Runkle, mathematics at MIT was regarded as service teaching for engineers. Harry W Tyler succeeded Runkle after his death in 1902, and continued as head until 1930. Tyler had been exposed to modern European mathematics and was influenced by Felix Klein and Max Noether.<ref>{{cite book|url=https://books.google.com/books?id=uMvcfEYr6tsC&pg=PA229|author=Parshall, Karen|author-link=Karen Parshall|author2=Rowe, David E.|author-link2=David E. Rowe|title=The Emergence of the American Mathematical Research Community 1876–1900: J. J. Sylvester, Felix Klein, and E. H. Moore|series=AMS/LMS History of Mathematics 8|location= Providence/London|year=1994|pages=229–230|isbn=9780821809075}}</ref> Much of the early work was on geometry.

Norbert Wiener, famous for his contribution to the mathematics of signal processing, joined the MIT faculty in 1919. By 1920, the department started publishing the Journal of Mathematics and Physics (in 1969 renamed as Studies in Applied Mathematics), a sign of its growing confidence; the first PhD was conferred to James E Taylor in 1925.

Among illustrious members of the faculty were Norman Levinson and Gian-Carlo Rota. George B. Thomas wrote the widely used calculus textbook Calculus and Analytical Geometry, known today as Thomas' Calculus. Longtime faculty member Arthur Mattuck received several awards for his teaching of MIT undergraduates.

References
 Joel Segel (editor) (2009) Recountings - Conversations with MIT Mathematicians'', AK Peters

External links
 MIT Mathematics Department website
 MIT OpenCourseWare: Mathematics

Mathematics Department
Mathematical institutes